Xinghua Township is a township of Tanchang County in southeastern Gansu province, China, located  northeast of the county seat. , it has eight villages under its administration.

See also 
 List of township-level divisions of Gansu

References 

Township-level divisions of Gansu